Shock and Double Shock were 1958-1959 American TV horror movie show with Bob Hersh as "The Advisor". Hersh used to emerge from a sarcophagus to introduce the horror B-movies.

References

External links
List of episodes
1958 American television series debuts
1959 American television series endings
1950s American television series
American horror fiction television series
Black-and-white American television shows
Horror movie television series